The 2012 Wakefield Metropolitan District Council election was held on 3 May 2012 to elect members of Wakefield Metropolitan District Council in West Yorkshire, England. One third of the council was up for election.

Council Make-up
The make up of the Council after the election was:

Election result 

 
 +/- compared with Wakefield Council election 2011.

Ward results

Ackworth, North Elmsall and Upton ward

Airedale and Ferry Fryston ward

Altofts and Whitwood ward

Castleford Central and Glasshoughton ward

Crofton, Ryhill and Walton ward

Featherstone ward

Hemsworth ward

Horbury and South Ossett ward

Knottingley ward

Normanton ward

Ossett ward

Pontefract North ward

Pontefract South

South Elmsall and South Kirkby ward

Stanley and Outwood East ward

Wakefield East ward

Wakefield North ward

Wakefield Rural ward

Wakefield South ward

Wakefield West ward

Wrenthorpe and Outwood West ward

References

2012 English local elections
2012
2010s in West Yorkshire